William Langford may refer to:
William Langford (rower) (1896–1973), Canadian rower
William Langford (cricketer) (1875–1957), English cricketer
William Langford (MP), Member of Parliament (MP) for Berkshire
William Langford (priest) (died 1814), Canon of Windsor
William Langford (golf) (1887–1977), golf course designer and civil engineer
Hasaan Ibn Ali (1931–1980), jazz pianist, whose birth name may have been William Henry Langford